Branchville Correctional Facility is an Indiana Department of Correction state prison for men, located in Branchville, Perry County, Indiana, on the southern edge of the state.  The prison is a medium-security facility opened in 1982 and has a capacity of 1,455.

As of 2019, the prison housed 1,448 inmates, and employed 256 staff.

References

Prisons in Indiana
Buildings and structures in Perry County, Indiana
1982 establishments in Indiana